On 28 November 2009 at 08:12 (UTC+8), Avient Aviation McDonnell Douglas MD-11F, registration Z-BAV (c/n 48408), on flight 324 from Shanghai Pudong International Airport to Manas International Airport, near Bishkek, crashed during its take off roll with the loss of 3 lives. As the aircraft rotated for departure, the tail struck the ground, and the aircraft then overshot the end of the runway, crashed and landed on top of a warehouse near the runway. The plane was written off. Avient took delivery of Z-BAV on 20 November 2009, 8 days before the crash.

This is the first ever accident that took place in Shanghai Pudong International Airport.

Official investigation reports have been difficult to acquire over the years; on 28 February 2020, an English translation of a "brief abstract" of a Chinese investigation became publicly available. According to this translated abstract, the thrust levers were never advanced to takeoff position, and the autothrust never transitioned to takeoff mode. The crew perceived through physical cues that thrust was abnormally low, but neither identified the problem nor took any corrective action. Simulations seemed to indicate that with timely corrective action, recovery and prevention of the accident was possible. Fatigue was suspected to be a contributing factor for all crew members, many suffering jetlag from lengthy travel and numerous time zone transitions to position themselves for the accident flight.

Crew members were from the United States (4), Indonesia (1), Belgium (1) and Zimbabwe (1).

Aircraft 
The aircraft was acquired from San Francisco-based Pegasus Aviation, an aircraft lessor. Delivered in 1990, this MD-11 was the first owned by Pegasus to be leased to Korean Airlines as a passenger airliner and then converted to a freighter in 1995, with the registration HL7372. On 9 January 2002, the plane had suffered a minor incident where its tail hit the ground during loading in Sydney Airport. The plane was returned to Pegasus in 2004. From 2005 to 2009 it was leased to Varig Logística of Brazil. It was the sistership of HL7373, the MD-11F which crashed in Shanghai Hongqiao International Airport due to pilot error when operating Korean Air Cargo Flight 6316 in 1999.

References

Accidents and incidents involving the McDonnell Douglas MD-11
Aviation accidents and incidents in China
Aviation accidents and incidents in 2009
2009 in China
November 2009 events in China